is an independent video game developer based in Osaka, Japan. Founded by former Capcom programmer Masakazu Matsushita in 2007, HexaDrive has worked on different titles for various systems, notably Rez HD, a HD remastering of the title Rez exclusively for Xbox Live Arcade and The 3rd Birthday which was a collaboration between HexaDrive and Square Enix.

Games

Notelist

References

External links
  

Japanese companies established in 2007
Video game companies established in 2007
Video game companies of Japan
Video game development companies
Companies based in Osaka Prefecture